Kimbrough is both a surname and a given name. Notable people with the name include:

Surname:
 Charles Kimbrough (1936–2023), actor
 Clint Kimbrough (1933–1996), actor
 Elbert Kimbrough (born 1938), American football player
 Emily Kimbrough (1899–1989), co-author of Our Hearts Were Young and Gay
 Frank Kimbrough (born 1956), jazz pianist
 Frank Kimbrough (American football) (1904–1971), American football player
 John Kimbrough (1918–2006), Texas athlete and politician
 Junior Kimbrough (1930–1998), blues musician
 Lottie Kimbrough (1900–unknown), American country blues singer
 Mary Craig Sinclair (1882–1961), née Kimbrough, writer, wife of Upton Sinclair
 Newman W. Kimbrough (1900–1975), American law enforcement, President FBI National Academy Associates 1949–1957 (Longest tenure as President of FBI NA), from Alabama
 Robert Shane Kimbrough (born 1967), astronaut
 Seth Kimbrough (born 1982), musician and BMX rider
 Stan Kimbrough (born 1966), basketball player
 Tony Kimbrough (born 1964), American football player
 Will Kimbrough (born 1964), singer-songwriter

Given name:
 James Kimbrough Jones (1839–1908), United States Senator
 Duke Kimbrough McCall (1914–2013), religious leader
 Kimbrough Stone (1875–1958), United States federal judge

See also
 Kimbrough, Alabama, unincorporated community in Alabama, United States
 Emily Kimbrough Historic District, in Muncie, Indiana
 Kimbrough Memorial Stadium, at West Texas A&M University
 Tom Kimbrough Stadium, in Murphy, Texas, USA
 William Kimbrough Pendleton House,in Eustis, Florida
 Kimbrough v. United States, a United States Supreme Court case about criminal sentencing
 Kimbra
 Kimbro (disambiguation)